Beidaihe District is a popular beach resort and a district of the city of Qinhuangdao, Hebei province on China's Bohai Sea coast. It is also known as a birding haven.

The Beidaihe Beach Resort stretches  from east to west, from the Yinjiao Pavilion to the mouth of the Daihe river. The beach itself is covered with fine yellow sand stretching some 100 meters to the sea. The water is shallow. Mount Lianfeng near the beach has two peaks covered by abundant green pines and cypresses. Lush vegetation, caves, decorated pavilions, secluded paths and winding bridges have made it attractive to visitors from throughout China.

English railway engineers were the first Europeans to discover the fishing village in the 1890s and it was not long before wealthy Chinese and foreign diplomats from Beijing and Tianjin made the village a popular destination.

Use by Communist Party

Because of its proximity to the capital, Beidaihe has been the location of many important official conferences, and has become well known as the Communist Party's summer retreat.  It is still commonly used by the Party's highest leadership each July to slip away from the summer heat of Beijing and to plan important strategies in the privacy Beidaihe offers. "Beidaihe," an American diplomat once said, "is China's 'smoke-filled room.'"

After Mao Zedong led the Communists to power in 1949, the new rulers also developed a taste for seaside atmosphere. Mao himself had a summer resort here. Sanatoriums sprang up to reward the efforts of model workers from every industry. A very large Friendship Guesthouse was constructed in 1954, one of dozens across China, to receive the Soviet "elder brothers" who came to assist Chinese development prior to tensions emerging between Soviet and Chinese leadership.

The most infamous event which occurred here involved Lin Biao, who on 13 September 1971, after he was accused of plotting a coup, fled to his villa here with his wife and a son and boarded a plane for the Soviet Union at the local airport; the plane crashed in Mongolia, killing everyone on board.

These conferences were abandoned by order of Hu Jintao in 2004, mainly for two reasons. First, a conference in a resort area appeared to contradict Hu and Wen Jiabao's goal in projecting a frugal image for the party. Second, it was a desire of the leadership under Hu to work through formal party and state mechanisms rather than informal gatherings.

Administrative divisions
There are two subdistricts and two towns in Beidaihe.

Subdistricts:
Xishan Subdistrict, Dongshan Subdistrict

Towns:
Haibin, Daihe, Niutouya

References

External links
Official website of Beidaihe District Government
Beidaihe - Migration Hub of the Orient - article on birding at and near the town
Historic US Army map of Qinghuangdao and Beidaihe, 1944

County-level divisions of Hebei
National parks of China
Qinhuangdao